Ringland Fisher "Rex" Kilpatrick (December 26, 1881 – November, 1955) was a college football player; later a builder and investment banker in the New York area. He was the younger brother of John Kilpatrick. He was one of the principal owners of the Tennessee River Coal Co.

Career
His father moved from New York to Bridgeport because of investment potential in real estate and mining.

Football
Kilpatrick was a prominent running back for the Sewanee Tigers of Sewanee: The University of the South from 1897 to 1900. He was one of the team's heavier players.

1899
He was a member of the 1899 "Iron Men" who won 5 games in 6 days and an undefeated conference championship. This was his best year; He kicked the field goal to defeat North Carolina for the title. Kilpatrick was selected All-Southern.  A documentary film about the team and Kilpatrick's role was released in 2022 called "Unrivaled:  Sewanee1899."

See also
1899 College Football All-Southern Team

References

American football halfbacks
All-Southern college football players
Sewanee Tigers football players
Players of American football from Alabama
People from Jackson County, Alabama
19th-century players of American football
Baseball pitchers
Sewanee Tigers baseball players
1955 deaths
1881 births
Players of American football from New York City
American football drop kickers